State Highway 51 (SH 51) is a New Zealand state highway that runs between Napier and Hastings via Clive.  Known locally as the Coastal Route, it was the main route between the two cities prior to the completion of the Hawke's Bay Expressway.

History 

Between the late 1960s and 2011, the nearby Hawke's Bay Expressway was constructed, providing a high-speed bypass of Napier and Hastings.  As the expressway was constructed in seven sections over 43 years, it had three separate state highway numbers (SH 2B,  and SH 50A), despite the expressway being a single length of road and being considered the spine of the Hawke's Bay roading network.  This resulted in a confusing driving experience for motorists, made even more so when  of SH 2 between the northern outskirts of Hastings and the southern terminus of the expressway at Pakipaki was revoked in 2005.

In 2019, an opportunity to renumber the Hawke's Bay state highways arose through the exchange of Meeanee Quay and Pandora Road in Napier (part of SH 2) becoming a local road under the authority of the Napier City Council, and nearby Prebensen Drive becoming a state highway under the authority of the New Zealand Transport Agency.  On 1 August 2019, the renumbering took effect:

 The entire Hawke's Bay Expressway became SH 2. SH 2B and SH 50A were revoked, while SH 50 continued to run over a section of the expressway, and was co-signed with SH 2 over this section.
 The former SH 2 between Napier and Hastings became SH 51, remaining a state highway alternative to the Hawke's Bay Expressway.
 Taradale Road, Hyderabad Road and Georges Drive, previously part of SH 50, also became part of SH 51, with SH 50 being shifted to run via Prebensen Drive.

The creation of SH 51 affected approximately 120 people and businesses with an address change along two sections of the route where the name of the road was the state highway number. Their addresses were automatically changed from State Highway 2 to State Highway 51 by New Zealand Post.

Route 

SH 51 leaves the Hawke's Bay Expressway at a roundabout west of Napier.  It initially heads to the north-east on Taradale Road, before following Hyderabad Road for a short distance.  It then runs to the south of the Napier city centre along Georges Drive.

SH 51 then meets the Hawke's Bay coast and turns south on Marine Parade.  The route then leaves Napier and follows the coast before heading inland at the Ngaruroro River estuary.  It runs through the small town of Clive and passes to the east of Whakatu before turning towards Hastings at a roundabout at Mangateretere.

Approaching Hastings from the north-east, the SH 51 designation ends in the outskirts of Hastings at the Kenilworth Road intersection.  The route continues into central Hastings as Karamu Road North.

Major intersections

See also 
 List of New Zealand state highways

References

External links 
 New Zealand Transport Agency

50
Transport in the Hawke's Bay Region